Kenneth M. Jadlowiec (born January 12, 1951) is a former Republican member of the Pennsylvania House of Representatives.

He is a 1968 graduate of North Hills High School. He attended Edinboro University from 1968 through 1971. He was first elected to represent the 67th legislative district in the Pennsylvania House of Representatives in 1986. He retired prior to the 2002 election.

References

External links
  official PA House profile

Living people
Republican Party members of the Pennsylvania House of Representatives
1951 births